"Bing Bong" is a single by the Super Furry Animals, released on 13 May 2016. The song was originally written for Euro 2004 but not released until the Euro 2016 campaign of the Wales national football team.

Reception
The song was referred to by NME as "a bonkers track, of course, which is absolutely apt for a band that always had a strong sense of the surreal" and "a brilliant epilogue for a singular career". They further suggested the single may be the last release by the band.

The track also appeared on the 2016 compilation "Zoom! The Best of 1995–2016".

References

2016 singles
Super Furry Animals songs
2016 songs
Rough Trade Records singles